Soccer Quebec (formerly ( FQS) or the Quebec Soccer Federation (QSF)) is the governing body for soccer in the Canadian province of Quebec. The QSF is one of thirteen provincial and territorial federations members of the Canadian Soccer Association. It is headquartered in Laval.

This federation was founded in 1911 and adopted its current name in 2000.

On June 10, 2013, the Canadian Soccer Association suspended the Quebec Soccer Federation over its refusal to let turban-wearing children play. Quebec's premier Pauline Marois announced her support of the Quebec Soccer Federation's ban and suggested that the CSF has no authority over provincial organizations.

In 2014, the QSF removed the ban after a ruling from FIFA that turbans are allowed for male players.

References

External links
 Quebec Soccer Federation - Official website

 
Soccer governing bodies in Canada
Soccer
Sports organizations established in 1911